States Newsroom is a U.S. tax-exempt organization that serves as an umbrella organization for state-focused news outlets with progressive editorial outlooks. Launched in 2019, it began as a sponsored project of the Hopewell Fund, a left-leaning nonprofit that does not disclose its donors. It grew out of NC Policy Watch, a progressive think tank in North Carolina founded by Chris Fitzsimon. Fitzsimon is States Newsroom's director and publisher.

States Newsroom had anticipated revenue of more than $27 million by the end of 2021. It grew from five affiliates upon its 2019 launch to 19 affiliates in 2020. States Newsroom planned to have more than 80 reporters on staff by the end of 2020. In July 2020, all the publications associated with States Newsroom were included in a resource created by the Nieman Foundation for Journalism purporting to show "hyperpartisan sites... masquerading as local news", but they were removed from the list after States Newsroom's national editor noted that the funding model is much more transparent and that many staffers for the group are longtime journalists.

The Wyss Foundation, founded by Swiss billionaire Hansjörg Wyss, has donated to States Newsroom. Media watchdog NewsGuard said State Newsroom's journalism had been "bought by people with a political agenda", a charge States Newsroom has rebutted.

In December 2021, States Newsroom announced plans to nearly double its presence from 25 states to 40 states. The organization reported raising $10 million in 2020. According to The Washington Post, "Their affiliates publish opinion pieces, much like newspapers' editorial pages, that largely lean left."

Affiliates
Affiliates of States Newsroom include:
 Alaska Beacon
 Arizona Mirror
 Arkansas Advocate
 Colorado Newsline
 Florida Phoenix
 Georgia Recorder
 Idaho Capital Sun
 Indiana Capital Chronicle
 Iowa Capital Dispatch
 Kansas Reflector
 Louisiana Illuminator
 Maine Beacon
 Maryland Matters
 Michigan Advance
 Minnesota Reformer
 Missouri Independent
 Daily Montanan
 Nebraska Examiner
 Nevada Current
 New Jersey Monitor
 Source NM
 South Dakota Searchlight
 New Hampshire Bulletin
 NC Policy Watch
 Ohio Capital Journal
 Oregon Capital Chronicle
 Pennsylvania Capital-Star
 Tennessee Lookout
 Virginia Mercury
 Wisconsin Examiner

References

External links
 

American journalism organizations
Non-profit organizations based in Washington, D.C.
Organizations established in 2019
Progressive organizations in the United States
2019 establishments in the United States
Nonprofit newspapers